Taz or TAZ may refer to:

Geography 
Taz (river), a river in western Siberia, Russia
Taz Estuary, the estuary of the river Taz in Russia

People 
 Taz people, an ethnic group in Russia
 Taz language, a form of Northeastern Mandarin spoken by the Taz people
 Taz Anderson (1938–2016), American football player
 Taz Bentley, American rock drummer
 Taz (singer), a British Indian singer
 TaZ (born 1986), nickname of Wiktor Wojtas, Polish Counter-Strike player
 Taz (wrestler) (born 1967), ring name of pro wrestler Peter Senerchia
 Taz, Rabbi David HaLevi Segal, author of Turei Zahav

Companies 
Tata Ace Zip, a micro-truck built by Tata Motors in India
Trnavské automobilové závody, a Slovakian car manufacturer
Tvornica Autobusa Zagreb, a Croatian bus and truck manufacturer

Science 
TAZ zinc finger, zinc-containing domains found in several transcriptional co-activators
"TAZ", the gene for muscle protein tafazzin
"TAZ", a transcription regulator protein encoded by the gene WWTR1

Video games 
Taz Express, 2000 video game for the Nintendo 64
Taz (video game), for the Atari 2600

Other uses 
Tasmanian Devil (Looney Tunes), a cartoon character
Die Tageszeitung, known as taz, a German daily newspaper
Temporary Autonomous Zone, a 1985 book by Hakim Bey
TAZ 90 (camouflage), Swiss military camouflage
"T.A.Z.", a song by Black Label Society from their debut album Sonic Brew
The Adventure Zone, a comedy Dungeons & Dragons podcast

Acronyms
Traffic analysis zone, a unit in transportation planning models

See also
TAS (disambiguation)

Language and nationality disambiguation pages